This discography is a partial list of recordings of "Lamento d'Arianna" (Ariadne's lament), the only surviving fragment of music from the lost opera L'Arianna (1608) by Claudio Monteverdi (1567–1643). The lament was saved from oblivion by the composer's decision to publish it independently from the opera; in 1614 as a five-voice madrigal, and in 1623 as an accompanied solo. The madrigal version was included in Monteverdi's Sixth Book of Madrigals. It appears in recordings of that collection, and in other madrigal selections.

Recordings of the solo version are more plentiful. Most of these employ a female voice, usually either a soprano or mezzo-soprano, but two contralto versions are available. There are also male voice versions for baritone, tenor and countertenor. The year and the label information are generally those of the most recent issue, and do not necessarily relate to the initial recording.

Five-voice madrigal (1614)
The 5-voice version of Lamento d'Arianna is included in all recordings of Monteverdi's Sixth Book of Madrigals.

Accompanied solo voice

References

External links
 
 

Opera discographies
Operas by Claudio Monteverdi